Kanth Assembly constituency is one of the 403 constituencies of the Uttar Pradesh Legislative Assembly, India. It is a part of the Moradabad district and one of the five assembly constituencies in the Moradabad Lok Sabha constituency. First election in this assembly constituency was held in 1957 after the delimitation order (DPACO - 1956) was passed in 1956. The constituency was assigned identification number 25 after "Delimitation of Parliamentary and Assembly Constituencies Order, 2008" was passed in the year 2008.

Wards / Areas
Extent of Kanth Assembly constituency is Kanth Teshil; PCs Baheri Brahmanan, Adampur, Salem Sarai, Maksoodpur of Jatpura KC, PCs Sadarpur, Milak Amawati, Kazipura, Gakkharpur, Mustafapur of Dilari KC of Thakurdwara Teshil & KC Pakbara of Moradabad Teshil.

Members of Vidhan Sabha

Election results

2022

2017

2012

1967 
 J. Singh (IND) : 30,583 votes   
 Dau Dayal Khanna (INC) : 17,233

See also

Government of Uttar Pradesh
List of Vidhan Sabha constituencies of Uttar Pradesh
Moradabad district
Moradabad Lok Sabha constituency
Sixteenth Legislative Assembly of Uttar Pradesh
Uttar Pradesh
Uttar Pradesh Legislative Assembly

References

External links
 

Assembly constituencies of Uttar Pradesh
Moradabad district
Constituencies established in 1956
1956 establishments in Uttar Pradesh